is a three-episode original video animation spin-off of Genshiken series, as well as a series of three light novels by Genshiken anime collaborator Michiko Yokote. Within the world of Genshiken, however, Kujibiki Unbalance is a popular manga and 26-episode anime adaptation, which is eagerly watched and discussed by the main characters. These same characters also  purchase associated products and adult-oriented dojinshi based on the series, which constitute the motivation for some of the "club activities" held by the Genshiken.

The series is, in essence, a compilation of many of the standard themes found in certain kinds of anime and manga series: childhood promises as the source of relationship drama, the influential yet shadowy Student Council, somewhat contrived scenarios designed to push the plot forward, mid-series "recaps" to remind viewers of previous events, and a sudden crisis that threatens to alienate the main characters and jeopardizes the outcome of the series.  Kujibiki Unbalance is meant to be a very stereotypical anime series, serving as both an homage to and a parody of the kinds of series that the otaku of Genshiken would enjoy.

The series was originally shown both as short "excerpts" within the Genshiken manga, as well as three full OVA episodes (labeled as episodes 1, 21, and 25 of an assumed 26-episode TV series) released to DVD with Genshiken in Japan. At Comiket 69, Media Factory announced the release of the second season of Genshiken, which was later clarified as being a 12-episode season of Kujibiki♥Unbalance. In a reversal of its OVA release alongside Genshiken, the DVD release of Kujibiki Unbalance included a total of three Genshiken OVA episodes, introducing the character Ogiue and continuing the plot of the manga from where the TV series left off.

History
Kujibiki Unbalance was originally a comic within a comic in the Genshiken manga, which also had an anime adaptation (which was sometimes discussed). When part of the manga of Genshiken was adapted to anime, the anime version of Kujibiki Unbalance was given greater emphasis though the manga is still the original work (the Genshiken members sometimes argue over the Kuji-Un anime's faithfulness to the manga). The version of Kujibiki Unbalance as it appeared in the Genshiken anime was made into a three episode OVA released to DVD along with Genshiken, allowing for a small glimpse of what those within Genshiken are almost always watching on television.

In May 2006, Anime News Network reported that the second series of Genshiken, to be released this fall in Japan, was in fact the "first season" of Kujibiki Unbalance, though with major character redesigns.

Meta-story
By the release of its fourth tankōbon volume, it gains an anime adaptation as well. Nearly all the members of the Genshiken read and discuss the series, and their favorite moments from the manga are detailed in Genshiken volume 2 (with club members writing under pseudonyms for their sporadically-published dojinshi, Mebaetame). The series' popularity is such that dojinshi based on the series, as well as models of the characters, are a hot item at conventions such as Comifes, and no less than four members of the club (Ohno,  Kohsaka, Ogiue, and, under great protest, Kasukabe) have cosplayed as characters from the series.

The Genshiken characters' opinions towards  the anime are slightly mixed. Their chief issue is that there are two different directors for the two halves of the series, resulting in a more comedic, ecchi tone for the first half (directed by "Tsutomu Mizudori"), which alienated some fans and led to conflict with the producers. However, they cannot deny that this helped contribute to the show's cult status, and it certainly does not stop them from rewatching the show or buying the DVDs. A typhoon apparently caused the broadcast of the final episode to be postponed, and it had not yet aired as of chapter 22 (episode 12 of the Genshiken anime), leading some to speculate that the true cause was poor animation quality, making the studio rework the final episodes for DVD release.

The three episodes of the 2004 OVA are meant to be taken as a part of the same 26-episode series that the characters of the 2004 Genshiken anime are watching. The 12-episode 2006 anime seems to be meant as a remake or re-imagining of the franchise (along the lines of Negima!? versus Negima!) within the Genshiken universe, as members of the club comment on each episode during the next episode previews. However, this version deviates between the Genshiken manga and anime: in the manga, it airs towards the end of Sasahara's fourth year in college, and is not mentioned in the dialogue, while in the anime, it airs at the beginning of Sasahara's third year, and is referenced (if not given much focus) in club activities. Genshiken Season 2 refers to, and features some scenes from, a new OVA continuation of the original series; this OVA has yet to be announced for a real-world release, however.

The manga, as presented within Genshiken, actually continues well beyond the "student body tournament" storyline depicted in the anime, going as far as to show Kasumi's wedding and the eventual graduation of Ritsuko. A newer, younger cast (including Tokino's younger sister), and a more science fiction–oriented story are subsequently introduced, but despite the potentials of the new plotline, members of the Genshiken lament that the series really isn't the same without Ritsuko and the other graduated cast members. (This is, of course, a subtle jab directed at Kio's own critics, who complained that Genshiken itself was not the same after Madarame, Kugayama, and Tanaka graduated, and that the author was finding excuses to keep them around after the fact.)

Anime
The real-world OVA consists of Episodes 1, 21 (the "re-cap" episode, common to many anime series and used here as a means of giving some idea of what has happened in prior, unseen episodes), and 25 (the penultimate episode, and first part of a two-part finale) of this metafictional series.  One episode is included in each of the three Genshiken DVDs released by Media Blasters in the United States.

As far as can be understood, Chihiro Enomoto is a freshman at the prestigious . The students of Rikkyoin are engaged in a year-long contest designed to determine which individuals will become the Student Council for the subsequent school year.  At the start of the contest, lots are drawn (kujibiki roughly translates to "drawing straws" or "drawing lots"), and students are organized into groups according to the numbers they draw.  These chance drawings also determine the positions and roles the students would take in the Student Council should the group they are a part of win the Kujibiki. (Chihiro, for example, would become Student Council Secretary.)

Competitions are staged between different groups, and because even one loss means that one's group is automatically eliminated from the Kujibiki, teamwork and cooperation is essential.  The competitions appear to range from mental exercises to physical challenges, including a cooking contest, a swimming race, endurance tests against both extreme heat and cold, and an intense war game.

The side-story running alongside the main plot seems to involve the cold and calculating Student Council President, Ritsuko Kübel Kettenkrad. The viewer learns from flashbacks that Ritsuko and Chihiro were childhood friends.  A pivotal and frequently-referenced scene in the series involves Ritsuko asking Chihiro to marry her someday, if she stops "being a crybaby".  On the rare occasions she and Chihiro speak during the Kujibiki, she never brings up their childhood, but there is plenty of evidence to indicate that it is never far from her thoughts.

Characters

Tokino's Team

   The main male character, and in many ways the main character of Kujibiki Unbalance. Chihiro is a very good natured person who is nicknamed "Happy Fortune" by his friend Mugio. His parents died when he was 10 years old, and since that time he has been living with his seemingly irresponsible older sister. Having fended for himself for quite some time, he is very good with cooking and cleaning. His role in the group is that of the secretary.
 

   A cheerful (though not overly bright) second-year student at Rikkyoin High. She is the group's "President", and therefore is a candidate to be next year's Student Council President. Tokino loves mushrooms to the point of obsession.  Her knowledge of mushrooms is encyclopedic; she knows them by sight and has an insatiable appetite for them. She is often seen carrying around a thick book entitled Mushrooms of the World
 

   A quiet and thoughtful girl, in line to be the next Student Council treasurer. She seems to be the sole caretaker for her younger triplet brothers and a frail younger sister called Koyuki. Komaki is very smart, and when at home does all chores to keep the house running smoothly for her and her siblings. As seen in the first OVA episode, she admits to not being a master cook, but her cooking skills appear to be quite good. She always wears a muffler on her neck, for a reason that is not known, but never takes it off no matter how hot it is or even if she is swimming.
 

   A tough and unsentimental girl, the next possible Student Council Vice-President. It is implied that her family has yakuza connections, and she is often seen playing high-stakes games of Mahjong—a game in which she is extremely skilled.  Another self-reliant character, Izumi does her best to make her own living through gambling and shuns offers of outside help.

Renko's Team
   A highly-strung, overachieving girl who considers Tokino her arch-enemy.  Renko's history with Tokino goes back to their days in kindergarten: it is revealed that Tokino once took so long in the bathroom that Renko, unable to wait any longer, wet herself.  Ever since that time, Renko has made it her personal mission to somehow embarrass and humiliate Tokino in return.  Renko has the unusual ability to read an entire book in under a minute—but unfortunately, she can only remember the information she has read for three minutes afterward.
 

   A member of Renko's team, clearly in awe of and devoted to Renko. Her primary job seems to be trying to keep "Renko-sama" (translated as "Mistress Renko") calm, but she does not succeed all that often.

Current Student Council

   A half-German girl, Ritsuko is the current President of the Student Council, and a childhood friend of Chihiro.  Despite their childhood promise (which is never fully explained in the manga, but is revealed in the anime as a promise that he will marry her if she stops "being a crybaby") and her obvious feelings for him, she works hard to hide these from him throughout the series. She wears a helmet which seems to be a mark of the office she holds. It seems she used to cry a lot, and has been working hard to stop her tears in an attempt to perhaps live up to a promise she made to Chihiro.  She also appears to have some sort of serious and possible life-threatening illness, though the OVA is vague on this point.  Kübel means bucket in German, and the Kettenkrad was a small tracked, motorcycle like vehicle used by the German army during World War II.
 

   The Vice-President and possibly Secretary of the current Student Council. Like Izumi, Kasumi comes from a yakuza family, and lost her parents as a child. She always carries a sword. She is cold and reserved, a ferocious fighter, and she seems to have only allowed one person—Ritsuko—to be truly close to her. She also has a habit of speaking her mind, which at time frightens Risa.
 

   Current Student Council Treasurer. Because Ritsuko counts on her, and treated her with respect when few of the other students in the school would, Lisa has become very faithful and unwaveringly loyal to Ritsuko. She is an American, and may have American citizenship. Lisa speaks in Kansai dialect.

Minor Characters
   Chihiro's elder sister (but her appearance makes her look like his younger sister), and a math teacher at Rikkyoin. While she can typically be found wearing glasses her personality can change when her glasses are not being worn.  She is also very clumsy at times, often falling down sets of stairs and seems to really like sake and just relaxing in her underwear when she doesn't need to be dressed.  She is dating Kaburaki-sensei, who in episode 25 asks to marry her.

   A good friend of Chihiro's, surprisingly uncompetitive in the face of the Kujibiki. His team lost early on so he never got a chance to face off against Chihiro's team.

 Alex  A gun-wielding assassin who appears in episode 21. According to Genshiken, he showed up in earlier episodes, and is in the opening, so he could be more of an important character than he seems.

Notes
In the manga version, the anime cast are imagined by the author (e.g. Yui Horie for Tokino). It didn't work out that way in reality.

Music Themes
Opening Theme
 performed by Under17 
Ending Theme
 performed by Under17

Episodes
Note: Only episodes 1, 21, and 25 have actually been produced. The rest of the episode titles are those revealed in the next-episode previews of the produced episodes, or listed in Genshiken chapter 22, on page 89 of volume 4. The titles for episodes 13–18 are obscured by panel and word-balloon boundaries, though the titles for episodes 14 and 16 are given in Genshiken volume 5.
{|class="wikitable" width="98%"
|-
! width="2%" | # !! Title
|-
| colspan="2" bgcolor="#CCF"|
|-

|}

Notes

References

External links
 Official Kujibiki Unbalance Homepage

2004 anime OVAs
2004 Japanese novels
Genco
Light novels
Media Blasters
Kids Station original programming
MF Bunko J
Fictional television shows
Anime spin-offs